The iReel Awards is an annual Indian award show, presented by News 18 to honour excellence of Indian web series. Winners are decided by online voting.

History
In August 2018, News18.com announced iReel Awards 2018, a web series specific awards in India. The first event was held on 6 September 2018 at JW Marriott, Juhu in Mumbai.

Ceremonies

Categories

Best Actor (Drama)

Best Actress (Drama)

Best Actor (Comedy)

Best Actress (Comedy)

Best Supporting Actor

Best Supporting Actress

Best Drama Series

Best Comedy Series

Best Writing (Drama)

Best Writing (Comedy)

Best Music

Best Non-fiction Show

Best Ensemble

See also

 List of Asian television awards

References 

Web series awards
Indian television awards